This is a list of singles that charted in the top ten of the Billboard Hot 100 during 1963.

Bobby Vinton, Lesley Gore, Peter, Paul and Mary, Dion, The Four Seasons, The Beach Boys, and Elvis Presley each had three top-ten hits in 1963, tying them for the most top-ten hits during the year.

Top-ten singles

1962 peaks

1964 peaks

See also
 1963 in music
 List of Billboard Hot 100 number-one singles of 1963
 Billboard Year-End Hot 100 singles of 1963

References

General sources

Joel Whitburn Presents the Billboard Hot 100 Charts: The Sixties
Additional information obtained can be verified within Billboard's online archive services and print editions of the magazine.

1963
United States Hot 100 Top 10